Natalie Portman is an actress and filmmaker with dual Israeli and American citizenship. She made her film debut in Luc Besson's action thriller Léon: The Professional, which starred her as the young protégée of a hitman. She followed this by appearing in Michael Mann's crime thriller Heat (1995), Ted Demme's romantic comedy Beautiful Girls (1996), and Tim Burton's science fiction comedy Mars Attacks! (1996). Three years later, her supporting role as the precocious, responsible daughter of a narcissistic mother played by Susan Sarandon in the drama Anywhere but Here earned Portman her first Golden Globe Award nomination. In the same year, she played Padmé Amidala in the first of the Star Wars prequel trilogy Star Wars: Episode I – The Phantom Menace, which brought her international recognition. She reprised the role in its sequels Star Wars: Episode II – Attack of the Clones (2002), and Star Wars: Episode III – Revenge of the Sith (2005).

For her performance as a stripper in Mike Nichols' romantic drama Closer (2004), she won the Golden Globe Award for Best Supporting Actress – Motion Picture, and received a nomination for the Academy Award for Best Supporting Actress. Two years later Portman portrayed vigilante Evey Hammond in the political thriller V for Vendetta for which she won the Saturn Award for Best Actress. In the same year, she hosted Saturday Night Live. In 2009, she starred as an adulteress in The Other Woman, which she also executively produced. In 2010, Portman's performance as a mentally tortured ballerina in Darren Aronofsky's psychological horror Black Swan won her the Academy Award for Best Actress, the Golden Globe Award for Best Actress in a Motion Picture – Drama, and the BAFTA Award for Best Actress in a Leading Role.

In 2011, she appeared in the comedies No Strings Attached and Your Highness. In the same year, Portman also played Jane Foster, the titular superhero's scientist girlfriend in Thor. She reprised the role in its sequels Thor: The Dark World (2013) and Thor: Love and Thunder (2022), she also reprised the role in Avengers: Endgame (2019). In 2015, she starred in Terrence Malick's romantic drama Knight of Cups, and made her feature film directorial debut with A Tale of Love and Darkness, an adaptation of Amos Oz's autobiographical novel of the same name; she also starred in the film. The following year, Portman portrayed Jacqueline Kennedy in the biographical drama Jackie, for which she received nominations for Best Actress at the BAFTA Awards, Golden Globe Awards, and Academy Awards. In 2018, Portman starred in the science fiction horror film Annihilation, and the drama Vox Lux.

Film

Television

Theater

Music videos

See also 
 List of awards and nominations received by Natalie Portman

Notes

References

External links 
 

Filmography
Actress filmographies
American filmographies